Hevoi FM is the provincial commercial radio station based in Masvingo.

References

Radio stations established in 2013
Radio stations in Zimbabwe